Stanley Arthur Lay  (27 July 1906 – 12 May 2003) was a New Zealand javelin thrower who competed at the 1928 Summer Olympics, 1930 British Empire Games, 1938 British Empire Games, and 1950 British Empire Games. In 1928, he finished seventh. At the British Empire Games he won a gold medal in 1930 and a silver in 1938, placing sixth in 1950.

Lay's best throw of 67.89 m was achieved in London on 7 July 1928 prior to the 1928 Olympics. Officials thought he had broken the world record, but they had overlooked Eino Penttilä's record throw of 69.88 the previous year. Lay's throw remained the Commonwealth record for 26 years.

Lay was a signwriter at Stratford, and could not afford the time off to go to the 1934 British Empire Games in London. At the 1950 Empire Games Lay took the oath on behalf of all competitors.

In the 1988 New Year Honours, Lay was appointed a Member of the Order of the British Empire, for services to sport. Two years later he was inducted into the New Zealand Sports Hall of Fame.

References

Further reading

 
Photo of Stan Lay, 1930s
Stan Lay Flies Higher, portrait by Virginia Winder, website of Puke Ariki, 13 August 2004

1906 births
2003 deaths
New Zealand male javelin throwers
Olympic athletes of New Zealand
Athletes (track and field) at the 1928 Summer Olympics
Athletes (track and field) at the 1930 British Empire Games
Athletes (track and field) at the 1938 British Empire Games
Athletes (track and field) at the 1950 British Empire Games
Commonwealth Games gold medallists for New Zealand
Commonwealth Games silver medallists for New Zealand
Sportspeople from Stratford, New Zealand
New Zealand Members of the Order of the British Empire
Sportspeople from New Plymouth
Commonwealth Games medallists in athletics
Medallists at the 1930 British Empire Games
Medallists at the 1938 British Empire Games